HD 72337, also known as HR 3370, is a solitary, bluish-white hued star located in the southern constellation Volans. With an apparent magnitude of 5.51, it is faintly visible to the unaided eye but only under ideal conditions.

Velocity 
Based on recent parallax measurements from the Gaia spacecraft, HD 72337 is currently located at a distance of  287 light years. The object made its closest approach 1.914 million years ago when it was 234 light years distant. At that distance, it brightened slightly to an apparent magnitude of 5.13.

Properties 
The stellar classification of HD 72337 is A0 V, indicating that it is an ordinary A-type main-sequence star.

References 

A-type main-sequence stars
72337
3370
041451
Volans (constellation)
Durchmusterung objects